Nicolò Lolli (born 11 October 1994) is an Italian professional footballer who plays for Tritium Calcio 1908.

Club career
Born in Forlì, Emilia–Romagna region, Lolli started his career at Romagnol club Cesena. Lolli made his Serie A debut on 29 April 2012, as a substitute of Adrian Mutu, in the match against F.C. Internazionale Milano. Lolli wore no.45 shirt that season. At the end of season Cesena relegated. 

Lolli played three games of 2012–13 Serie B season. That season he picked no.28 shirt previously owned by Yohan Benalouane.

On 5 August 2013, he was signed by San Marino Calcio. The club also signed Saša Čičarević, Yago Del Piero (Cesena/Inter), Marco Paolini (Parma/Cesena) and Stefano Sensi from Cesena. San Marino finished as the 15th (out of 16th) of Group A of 2013–14 Lega Pro Prima Divisione. However, due to the merger of the two divisions of Lega Pro, the club did not relegate. That season Cesena also promoted to Serie A.

On 30 June 2014, the last day of 2013–14 financial year, Ravaglia, Lolli and Turchetta were sold to fellow Serie A club Parma, with Cascione, Traoré and Crialese moved to opposite direction.

References

External links
 Lega Serie A profile 
 Lega Serie B profile 

Italian footballers
A.C. Cesena players
A.S.D. Victor San Marino players
Parma Calcio 1913 players
Serie A players
Serie B players
Serie C players
Association football forwards
People from Forlì
Footballers from Emilia-Romagna
1994 births
Living people
Sportspeople from the Province of Forlì-Cesena